The Commissioner of Health of the City of New York is the head of the city's Department of Health and Mental Hygiene. The commissioner is appointed by the Mayor of New York City, and also serves on the city's Board of Health with the chairperson of the Department's Mental Hygiene Advisory Board and nine other members appointed by the mayor.

History
The Metropolitan Board of Health, which was the predecessor agency to the Department of Health and consisted of sanitary and vital statistics bureaus, had its first meeting on March 5, 1866. The modern Department of Health, under a single commissioner, was formed by the New York City Charter revision pursuant to Chapter 137 of the Laws of 1870 passed by the New York State legislature. In the early years after its formation, commissioners were sometimes political appointments, with no experience in medicine or related fields. In 2002, the Department of Health was merged with the Department of Mental Health, Mental Retardation and Alcoholism Services to form the Department of Health and Mental Hygiene.

Qualifications
City regulations currently require that the commissioner of health must be a doctor of medicine, and have either
 an M.P.H. degree, an M.B.A. or M.P.A. degree with concentration in the health field, or an equivalent degree and at least five years' teaching experience college or university public health, or
 at least five years' experience in public health administration.

Duties
According to the New York City Charter, the commissioner is broadly responsible for preparing plans for construction and operation of medical and health care facilities and establishing their priorities, has the power to compel the testimony of witnesses and produce reports and documents in matters regarding health, and assess penalties up to $1,000 for violations or failures to comply with health notices or regulations. These duties involve regulating and overseeing matters ranging from reportable contagious diseases, to registration of birth and deaths, restaurant inspections, selling food from carts, selling tobacco products to minors and monitoring of smoking in public areas, regulation of wild animals, and sending health alerts to the public and doctors.

List of Commissioners of Health of the City of New York

References 

Government of New York City
 
New York City Department of Health and Mental Hygiene